Liburn Aliu is a Kosovo-Albanian politician, Vetëvendosje member and current Minister of Environment, Spatial Planning and Infrastructure.

Career
Liburn Aliu was born on April 10, 1975 in Prishtina. He attended primary school in the school "Hasan Prishtina", secondary school in the gymnasium "Xhevdet Doda" in Prishtina and the University of Prishtina, where he graduated from the Faculty of Civil Engineering and Architecture, Department of Architecture.

Aliu has worked as an architect in high design and construction, and has been involved in the restoration of cultural heritage monuments, where he has overseen the restoration work.

Liburn Aliu's political activities began in 1994 with the National Movement for the Liberation of Kosovo.

References

1975 births
Living people
Kosovo Albanians
Politicians from Pristina
University of Pristina alumni
Environment ministers of Kosovo
Infrastructure ministers of Kosovo
Vetëvendosje politicians